Ashland is a historic home located in Upper Marlboro, Prince George's County, Maryland, United States. It is a -story, hip-roofed frame dwelling with fine Victorian Italianate decorative detail. It was built in 1866-1867 by William Beanes Hill of Compton Bassett for his son, William Murdock Hill. The house has been continuously associated with the prominent Hill family. Ashland is one of only a few significant frame dwellings of the Italianate style which survive in the county. It has a simple square floor plan, with cross gables in each plane of the hip roof.  Also on the property are historic outbuildings.

Ashland was listed on the National Register of Historic Places in 1994.

References

External links
, including photo in 1993, at Maryland Historical Trust website

Houses completed in 1867
Houses in Prince George's County, Maryland
Houses on the National Register of Historic Places in Maryland
Italianate architecture in Maryland
National Register of Historic Places in Prince George's County, Maryland